A guided-missile destroyer (DDG) is a destroyer whose primary armament is guided missiles so they can provide anti-aircraft warfare screening for the fleet. The NATO standard designation for these vessels is DDG, while destroyers which have a primary gun armament and/or a small number of anti-aircraft missiles sufficient only for point-defense are designated DD. Nations vary in their use of destroyer D designation in their hull pennant numbering, either prefixing or dropping it altogether.

Guided-missile destroyers are equipped with large missile magazines, with modern examples typically having vertical-launch cells. Some guided-missile destroyers contain integrated weapons systems, such as the United States’ Aegis Combat System, and may be adopted for use in an anti-missile or ballistic-missile defense role. This is especially true for navies that no longer operate cruisers, so other vessels must be adopted to fill in the gap. Many guided-missile destroyers are also multipurpose vessels, equipped to carry out anti-surface operations with surface-to-surface missiles and naval guns, and anti-submarine warfare with torpedoes and helicopters.

Active and planned guided-missile destroyers

Royal Australian Navy 

HMAS Hobart (DDG-39)
HMAS Brisbane (DDG-41)
HMAS Sydney (DDG-42)

Chinese People's Liberation Army Navy
Type 055 (Renhai-class) destroyer 
Nanchang (DDG-101)
La'sa (DDG-102)
Dalian (DDG-105)
Anshan (DDG-103)
Yan'an (DDG-106)
Wuxi (DDG-104)
Zunyi (DDG-107)
Innominate 8th ship (Fitting out)

Type 052D (Luyang III-class) destroyer
Kunming (DDG-172)
Changsha (DDG-173)
Hefei (DDG-174) 
Yinchuan (DDG-175) 
Xining (DDG-117)
Xiamen (DDG-154)
Urumqi (DDG-118)
Guiyang (DDG-119)
Nanjing (DDG-155)
Taiyuan (DDG-131)
Hohhot (DDG-161)
Chengdu (DDG-120)
Qiqihar (DDG-121)
Zibo (DDG-156)
Tangshan (DDG-122)
Suzhou (DDG-132)
Huainan (DDG-123)
Nanning (DDG-162)
Kaifeng (DDG-124)
Guilin (DDG-164)
Baotou (DDG-133)
Zhenjiang (DDG-165) (Fitting out)
Shaoxing (DDG-134) (Sea trials)
Jiaozuo (DDG-163) (Sea trials)
Zhuhai (DDG-157) (Sea trials)

Type 052C (Luyang II-class) destroyer
Lanzhou (DDG-170)
Haikou (DDG-171)
Changchun (DDG-150)
Zhengzhou (DDG-151)
Jinan (DDG-152)
Xi'an (DDG-153)
Type 052B (Luyang I-class) destroyer
Guangzhou (DDG-168)
Wuhan (DDG-169)
Type 051C (Luzhou-class) destroyer
Shenyang (DDG-115)
Shijiazhuang (DDG-116)
Type 051B (Luhai-class) destroyer
Shenzhen (DDG-167)

Hangzhou (DDG-136)
Fuzhou (DDG-137)
Taizhou (DDG-138)
Ningbo (DDG-139)

French Navy 
Although the French Navy no longer uses the term "destroyer", the largest frigates are assigned pennant numbers with flag superior "D", which designates destroyer.
  (in France designated as frigate, designated as destroyers using NATO classification) 
Forbin (D620)
Chevalier Paul (D621)

Indian Navy 
 
  
 
  (Fitting out)
  (Fitting out)

 
 
  

 
 
 
 
 
 
 
Project 18(planned)

Italian Navy 

Luigi Durand De La Penne (D 560)
Francesco Mimbelli (D 561)
 
Andrea Doria (D553)
Caio Duilio (D554)

Japan Maritime Self-Defense Force 

JS Maya (DDG-179)
JS Haguro (DDG-180)

JS Atago (DDG-177)
JS Ashigara (DDG-178)

JS Kongo (DDG-173)
JS Kirishima (DDG-174)
JS Myoko (DDG-175)
JS Chokai (DDG-176)

JS Hatakaze (DDG-171)
JS Shimakaze (DDG-172)

Republic of Korea Navy 

ROKS Sejong the Great (DDG-991)
ROKS Yulgok Yi I (DDG-992)
ROKS Seoae Yu Seong-ryong (DDG-993)

Russian Navy 

Burny (778)
Nastoychivy (610)
Admiral Ushakov (434)

Vice-Admiral Kulakov (626)
Admiral Tributs (564)
Marshal Shaposhnikov (543)
Severomorsk (619)
Admiral Levchenko (605)
Admiral Vinogradov (572)
Admiral Panteleyev (548)
Admiral Chabanenko (650)

Republic of China Navy 

 (ex-Kidd class)
ROCS Kee Lung (DDG-1801)
ROCS Su Ao (DDG-1802)
ROCS Tso Ying (DDG-1803)
ROCS Ma Kong (DDG-1805)

Royal Navy 
Type 45 destroyer

 Type 83 destroyer (planned)

Spanish Navy 
  (in Spain designated as frigate, designated as destroyers using NATO classification)
Álvaro de Bazán (F101)
Almirante Juan de Borbón (F102)
Blas de Lezo (F103)
Méndez Núñez (F104)
Cristóbal Colón (F105)

United States Navy

USS Arleigh Burke (DDG-51)
USS Barry (DDG-52)
USS John Paul Jones (DDG-53)
USS Curtis Wilbur (DDG-54)
USS Stout (DDG-55)
USS John S. McCain (DDG-56)
USS Mitscher (DDG-57)
USS Laboon (DDG-58)
USS Russell (DDG-59)
USS Paul Hamilton (DDG-60)
USS Ramage (DDG-61)
USS Fitzgerald (DDG-62)
USS Stethem (DDG-63)
USS Carney (DDG-64)
USS Benfold (DDG-65)
USS Gonzalez (DDG-66)
USS Cole (DDG-67)
USS The Sullivans (DDG-68)
USS Milius (DDG-69)
USS Hopper (DDG-70)
USS Ross (DDG-71)
USS Mahan (DDG-72)
USS Decatur (DDG-73)
USS McFaul (DDG-74)
USS Donald Cook (DDG-75)
USS Higgins (DDG-76)
USS O'Kane (DDG-77)
USS Porter (DDG-78)
USS Oscar Austin (DDG-79)
USS Roosevelt (DDG-80)
USS Winston S. Churchill (DDG-81)
USS Lassen (DDG-82)
USS Howard (DDG-83)
USS Bulkeley (DDG-84)
USS McCampbell (DDG-85)
USS Shoup (DDG-86)
USS Mason (DDG-87)
USS Preble (DDG-88)
USS Mustin (DDG-89)
USS Chafee (DDG-90)
USS Pinckney (DDG-91)
USS Momsen (DDG-92)
USS Chung-Hoon (DDG-93)
USS Nitze (DDG-94)
USS James E. Williams (DDG-95)
USS Bainbridge (DDG-96)
USS Halsey (DDG-97)
USS Forrest Sherman (DDG-98)
USS Farragut (DDG-99)
USS Kidd (DDG-100)
USS Gridley (DDG-101)
USS Sampson (DDG-102)
USS Truxtun (DDG-103)
USS Sterett (DDG-104)
USS Dewey (DDG-105)
USS Stockdale (DDG-106)
USS Gravely (DDG-107)
USS Wayne E. Meyer (DDG-108)
USS Jason Dunham (DDG-109)
USS William P. Lawrence (DDG-110)
USS Spruance (DDG-111)
USS Michael Murphy (DDG-112)
USS John Finn (DDG-113)
USS Ralph Johnson (DDG-114)
USS Rafael Peralta (DDG-115)
USS Thomas Hudner (DDG-116)
USS Paul Ignatius (DDG-117)
USS Daniel Inouye (DDG-118)
USS Delbert D. Black (DDG-119)
USS Carl M. Levin (DDG-120) (Sea trials complete)
USS Frank E. Petersen Jr. (DDG-121)
USS John Basilone (DDG-122) (Fitting out)
USS Lenah H. Sutcliffe Higbee (DDG-123) (Fitting out)
USS Harvey C. Barnum Jr. (DDG-124) (Under construction)
USS Jack H. Lucas (DDG-125) (Sea trials)
USS Louis H. Wilson Jr. (DDG-126) (Contract awarded)
USS Gallagher (DDG-127) (Contract awarded)
USS Ted Stevens (DDG-128) (Approved for construction)
USS Jeremiah Denton (DDG-129) (Approved for construction)
 (DDG-130) (Approved for construction)
USS George M. Neal (DDG-131) (Approved for construction)
USS Quentin Walsh (DDG-132) (Approved for construction)
USS Sam Nunn (DDG-133) (Approved for construction)
USS John E. Kilmer (DDG-134) (Approved for construction)
USS Thad Chochran (DDG-135) (Approved for construction)
USS Richard G. Lugar (DDG-136) (Approved for construction)
USS John F. Lehman (DDG-137) (Approved for construction)
USS J. William Middendorf (DDG-138) (Approved for construction)
USS Telesforo Trinidad (DDG-139) (Approved for construction)

 (Sea trials)
DDG(X) (planned)

Former guided-missile destroyer classes 

Perth-class destroyer (decommissioned/sunk as dive wrecks)
 
Iroquois-class destroyer (decommissioned/retired)

These classes of French "frigates" had "D" pennant numbers and were destroyer-sized

 (decommissioned/retired)
 (decommissioned/retired)

Amatsukaze-class destroyer (decommissioned/retired)
 (decommissioned/retired)

 (decommissioned/scrapped)
 (decommissioned/retired)

 (decommissioned/scrapped/sunk)
Type 82 destroyer (decommissioned)

Type 42 destroyer (decommissioned/scrapped)

Farragut (Coontz)-class destroyer (decommissioned/scrapped)
 (all but one sunk for target or scrapped; 1 reserved for future preservation as museum ship)
The  was designated as the DDG-47 class in its early development, prior to the United States Navy 1975 ship reclassification, which made it the CG-47 class. The first  was designated DDG-51, as the hull numbers DDG-47-50 had been used for Ticonderoga-class ships.
 (sold to Taiwan as Kee Lung-class destroyers)

References

 

Destroyers